Henry Koewing "Hal" Schenck is an American mathematician, known for his work in algebraic geometry and commutative algebra.  He holds the Rosemary Kopel Brown Eminent Scholars Chair in mathematics at Auburn University.

Education
Schenck attended Carnegie Mellon University for his undergraduate degree.  After receiving his BS degree in 1986, he spent 4 years serving in the United States Army, leaving the service as a Captain.  He then went on to Cornell University for his graduate work.  After an MS in 1994, he completed his PhD in mathematics in 1997.  His thesis was titled Homological Methods in the Theory of Splines, and was advised by Michael Stillman.

Career
Following completion of his PhD, Schenck held postdoctoral appointments at Northeastern University, then at Harvard University.  He moved to Texas A&M University as an assistant professor in 2001, and was promoted to associate professor there.  In 2007, he moved to the University of Illinois, where he was promoted to full professor in 2012.  In 2017, he moved to Iowa State University, where he served as chair of the Department of Mathematics.  He was appointed as the Rosemary Kopel Brown Eminent Scholars Chair in Mathematics at Auburn University in 2019.

Schenck has been (with Catherine Yan) one of the editors-in-chief of Advances in Applied Mathematics since 2018.  He was a founding editor (with Jim Coykendall) of the Journal of Commutative Algebra.

Awards and honors
Schenck was elected as a fellow of the American Mathematical Society in 2020 for "contributions to research and exposition in applications of algebraic geometry and for service to the profession."

Books

References

External links

Living people
20th-century American mathematicians
21st-century American mathematicians
Algebraic geometers
Carnegie Mellon University alumni
Cornell University alumni
Texas A&M University faculty
University of Illinois faculty
Iowa State University faculty
Auburn University faculty
Year of birth missing (living people)
Fellows of the American Mathematical Society